The University of North Carolina Asheville (UNC Asheville, UNCA, or simply Asheville) is a public liberal arts university in Asheville, North Carolina, United States. UNC Asheville is the designated liberal arts institution in the University of North Carolina system. UNC Asheville is a member and the headquarters of the Council of Public Liberal Arts Colleges.

History
UNC Asheville was founded in 1927 as Buncombe County Junior College, part of the Buncombe County public school system. It was the first tuition free public college in the United States. It was located in the Biltmore School in south Asheville on Hendersonville Road (U.S. 25). In 2001, Biltmore School was recognized by the Save America's Treasures program. 

During the Great Depression, the college started charging tuition. In 1930 the school merged with the College of the City of Asheville (founded in 1928) to form Biltmore Junior College. In 1934 the college was renamed Biltmore College. In 1936, the name changed to Asheville-Biltmore College, and control was transferred to the Asheville City Schools.

In 1949, the college relocated to the 20,000-square foot Overlook Castle, also known as Seely's Caste, which included 29 acres on the crest of Sunset Mountain. Evelyn Grove Seely, widow of Fred Loring Seely, sold Overlook to the college $125,000; she also donated $50,000 to the acquisition fund. The college renamed the house Seely Hall, as requested by the seller. The house, no longer part of the college, was named to the National Register of Historic Places in 1980.

In 1961, Asheville-Biltmore College moved to the present UNC Asheville campus in north Asheville. That year, the college desegregated with the enrollment of Etta Mae Whitner Patterson. In 1963 it became a state-supported four-year college, and awarded its first bachelor's degrees in 1966. Its first residence halls were built in 1967. It adopted its current name in 1969 upon becoming part of the Consolidated University of North Carolina, since 1972 called the University of North Carolina System. 

UNC Asheville desegregated its faculty in 1981, along with all schools in the University of North Carolina. It is one of three baccalaureate colleges within the University of North Carolina System, and has been classified as a Liberal Arts I institution since 1992.

Administration 
The university operates under the guidance and  policies of the Board of Trustees of the University of North Carolina at Asheville. Members of the board are appointed by the governor of North Carolina. As part of the  seventeen-campus University of North Carolina System, UNC Asheville also falls under the administration of the system's president, Peter Hans. The UNC System is administered by the UNC Board of Governors, which is elected by the North Carolina Legislature, and advised by the UNC Faculty Assembly. Kimberly van Noort, former interim provost, is currently serving as interim chancellor of UNC Asheville, following the departure of Nancy Cable in December 2022.

Chief executive officers

Presidents/Deans
1927–1932: S.B. Conley, Dean
1932–1936: A.C. Reynolds, President
1936–1941: Charles A. Lloyd, Dean
1945–1946: William H. Morgan, Dean
1946–1947: Clarence N. Gilbert, Dean
1947–1947: R.A. Tomberlin, President
1947–1962: Glenn L. Bushey, President
1962–1969: William E. Highsmith, President

Chancellors
1969–1977: William E. Highsmith
1977–1977: Arnold K. King, acting
1977–1984: William E. Highsmith
1984–1990: David G. Brown
1990–1991: Roy Carroll, interim
1991–1993: Samuel Schuman
1994–1994: Larry Wilson, interim
1994–1999: Patsy Reed
1999–2005: James H. Mullen, Jr.
2005–2014: Anne Ponder
2014–2015: Doug Orr, interim
2015–2017: Mary K. Grant
2017–2018: Joseph Urgo, interim
2018–2022: Nancy J. Cable
2022-present: Kimberly van Noort, interim

Campus 
The campus includes 365 acres in a small city setting. Noteworthy campus features include:
 Bob Moog Electric Music Studio is named for Robert Moog, former professor and inventor of the Moog synthesizer
 Botanical Gardens at Asheville is adjacent to campus and features 600 plant species on ten acres with walking trails
 Carol Belk Theatre seats 200 people and is used for Theatre UNCA and other performances
 Kimmel Area with seating for 3,200 people is used for basketball and concerts
 Lookout Observatory for astronomical research is open to the public for stargazing and includes a collection of images from the universe
 N.C. Center for Health & Wellness, including biofeedback lab and meditation space
 Wilma Dykeman Writers-in-Residence home
 S. Tucker Cooke Gallery is used for student and faculty art exhibits
 Earthworks from the Civil War Battle of Asheville are preserved on campus.

Academics

Curriculum 
UNC Asheville operates on a semester calendar. It offers four-year undergraduate programs leading to Bachelor of Arts, Bachelor of Fine Arts, and Bachelor of Science degrees in 36 majors, and is classified by the Carnegie Classification of Institutions of Higher Education as a Baccalaureate College–Arts & Sciences (Bac/A&S). 

The University's most popular majors include biology/biological sciences, business administration and management, computer science, digital arts, English language and literature, mass communication/media studies, psychology, and sociology. It also offers joint degrees with North Carolina State University, including a 2-2 B.S. in engineering, a 3-1 B.S. in engineering, and a joint B.S. in engineering in mechatronics concentration.

All students complete a capstone or culminating academic experience. UNC Asheville founded the National Conference on Undergraduate Research and has hosted the event five times. Some sixty percent of student complete undergraduate research or creative project. Around 20% of students participate in study abroad or study away. More than 48 of its graduates have received Fulbright Fellowships.

Located on campus, the Osher Lifelong Learning Institute has some 220 faculty and offer more than 350 classes each year.

Faculty 
UNC Asheville had 222 full-time faculty members the fall of 2022, with 87% holding terminal degrees in their field. Another 99 faculty serve part-time. Faculty teach all classes, there are no teaching assistants. Nearly sixty percent of the classes have less than twenty students. As of 2022, the student-faculty ratio is 14:1.

Admissions 
UNC Asheville's acceptance rate for the fall of 2021 was 82%. At that time, total enrollment was 3,233, with 57% female students and 43% male students. As of fall 2020, students come from 43 states and seventeen countries; 12% of the current study body is from outside of North Carolina. The student demographics are 73.57% White, 8.84% Hispanic, 5.11% Black, 1.68% Asian, and 5.08% unknown. 87% of the enrollees are full-time students.

There are deadlines for admissions and either a ACT or SAT is required. In the 2020-2021 academic year, 35% of students received a Pell Grant.

Library 
D. Hiden Ramsey Library is located in the center of campus. It includes the Media Design Lab and the crAFT (Creativity, Art, Fabrication, and Technology) Studio. The library's holdings include Special Collections and University Archives which started in 1977 as the Southern Highlands Research Center and focuses on the history Asheville and Western North Carolina.

Annually, the library gives the Ramsey Library Community Author Award; the winner receives a yearlong residency in the library.

Rankings and reputation 
In 2022-2023, UNC Asheville's ranking in U.S. New & World Report 8 in Top Public Liberal Arts Schools and 136 in National Liberal Arts Colleges. It also ranked 130 in Best Undergraduate Engineering Program for institutions that do not offer a doctorate.

The Princeton Review ranked UNC Asheville as number six for Green Matters, number nine for LGBTQ-Friendly, number 25 for Best Quality of Life, number 22 for Most Politically Active Students, and number 15 for its College City.

The 2022 edition of The Fiske Guide named UNC Asheville a best-buy; the list only includes ten public and ten private universities from across the United States. In 2019, Forbes magazine ranked UNC Asheville number 494 in Top Colleges, number 176 in Public Colleges, and number 165 in Liberal Arts Universities. Washington Monthly ranked UNC Asheville number 76 on its 2022 Best Bang for the Buck Rankings: Southeast and number 77 for its national Liberal Arts Colleges Ranking.

Student life

Organizations and activities 
There are more than sixty campus clubs and organizations. Student activities include Greek organizations, with 2% of males belonging to a fraternity and 1% of females belonging to the one sorority. Some 44% of students participate in a service learning project, while 11% participate in intramural sports. 

UNC Asheville's Student Government Association (SGA) consists of two branches, an eighteen-seat Student Senate and an executive branch comprising a president, vice-president, and Cabinet. UNCA Out is a student group dedicated to students that identify as lesbian, gay, bisexual, trans, queer, questioning, two-spirit, intersexed, and straight allies.

UNC Asheville’s Concerts on the Quad features weekly outdoor concerts during the summer months. The North Asheville Tailgate Market opens Saturdays, April through November, and features around forty local vendors.

Dining 
UNC Asheville Dining Services are located in Brown Dining Hall. In 2019, it served 265, 318 meals to 67,279 dinner. It donated to Food Connections, weekly.

Housing 
In the fall of 2021, 46% of students live on campus.

Athletics

UNC Asheville's athletics teams are known as the Bulldogs. They are a member of the NCAA's Division I and compete in the Big South Conference. The university's colors are blue and white. Men's sports include baseball, basketball, cross country, soccer, tennis, and both indoor and outdoor track and field. Women's sports include basketball, cross country, diving, golf, soccer, swimming, tennis, indoor and outdoor track and field, and volleyball.

Notable alumni
 Kristina Abernathy - meteorologist at The Weather Channel
 Sarah Addison Allen – author
 Anne-Marie Baiynd – author and analyst in the financial field
 Timothy Lee Barnwell – photographer and author
 Molly Burch – singer-songwriter
 Tony Campana – professional baseball player
 Cliff Cash – stand-up comedian
 Wiley Cash – author 
 Michael Cogdill – journalist, news anchor, novelist, screenwriter, and film producer
 Matt Dickey – basketball player
 Ryan Dull – Major League Baseball player
 Wilma Dykeman – writer and environmentalist
 Jason Faunt – actor
 Kenny George – tallest player (7'7") in NCAA men's basketball history
 Joey Harrell – former professional basketball player
 Keith Hornsby – professional basketball player
 Todd Interdonato – college baseball coach
 Ashley Johnson – member of Puerto Rico national soccer team
 Lassi Hurskainen – professional soccer player
 Veronica Johnson – meteorologist at WJLA-TV
 Autumn Kent – mathematician specializing in topology and geometry
 Kevin Mattison – former professional baseball player
 Alana McLaughlin – mixed martial arts fighter
 Troy Miller - golf course architect
 Nick McDevitt – college basketball head coach
 Henry Patten – tennis players
 Josh Pittman – former professional basketball player
 J. P. Primm – basketball player
 Jaleel Roberts – professional basketball player
 Ann B. Ross – author
 Andrew Rowsey – professional basketball player
 Jalen Seegars – basketball player
 Mike Shildt – Major League Baseball manager
 Topper Shutt – chief meteorologist at WUSA-TV in Washington, DC
 Bryan Smithson – professional basketball player
 Brad Sowder – Emmy Award winning meteorologist
 Stemage (Grant Henry) – guitarist and composer
 Dwayne Sutton – professional basketball player
 Patrick Tate – former professional soccer player
 Roy A. Taylor – member of U.S. Congress  
 MaCio Teague – professional basketball player  
 Jethro Waters – Emmy Award winning filmmaker  
 Ty Wigginton – Major League Baseball player
 Susana Žigante – professional soccer player

Notable faculty and staff

Academics 

Wiley Cash – author and writer in residence
 Richard Chess – literature and language professor, director of the Center for Jewish Studies and the Creative Writing Program.
 Jane Fernandes –  former provost and vice-chancellor
 Grant Hardy – historian
 Tommy Hayes – former faculty, author, and founder of the Great Smokies Writing Program
 David Brendan Hopes – professor of literature
 Elliot Mazer – audio engineer and record producer
 Robert Moog – inventor of the Moog synthesizer and former research professor of music
 Ann B. Ross – literature instructor
 Sylvia Wilkinson – author and former faculty
 Christopher Oakley - animator and professor of new media

Athletics 
 Steve Adlard – former director of soccer and former professional soccer player
 Eddie Biedenbach – former men's basketball coach and professional basketball player
 Jim Bretz – former baseball coach
 Herbert Coman – former football coach
 Janet Cone – athletic director
 Michelle Demko – former women's soccer coach
 Don Doucette – former basketball coach
 Ed Farrell – former athletic director
 Scott Friedholm – baseball coach
 Jerry Green – former basketball coach
 Brenda Mock Kirkpatrick – former women's basketball head coach
 Katie Meier – former assistant women's basketball coach
 Mike Morrell – basketball coach
 Matt Myers – former baseball coach
 Ryan Odom – former assistant basketball coach
 Matt Reid – former baseball coach
 Mike Roberts – former baseball coach
 Tom Smith – former baseball coach
 Sammy Stewart – former baseball coach and former professional baseball player
 Monte Towe – former assistant basketball coach

References

External links

 of UNC Asheville Athletics

 
Educational institutions established in 1927
University of North Carolina Ashville
University of North Carolina at Asheville
Universities and colleges accredited by the Southern Association of Colleges and Schools
Buildings and structures in Asheville, North Carolina
1927 establishments in North Carolina
Public liberal arts colleges in the United States